This is a list of the mammal species recorded in Antigua and Barbuda. Of the mammal species in Antigua and Barbuda, one is vulnerable.

The following tags are used to highlight each species' conservation status as assessed by the International Union for Conservation of Nature:

Order: Sirenia (manatees and dugongs) 

Sirenia is an order of fully aquatic, herbivorous mammals that inhabit rivers, estuaries, coastal marine waters, swamps, and marine wetlands. All four species are endangered.

Family: Trichechidae
Genus: Trichechus
 West Indian manatee, T. manatus  extirpated

Order: Chiroptera (bats) 
The bats' most distinguishing feature is that their forelimbs are developed as wings, making them the only mammals capable of flight. Bat species account for about 20% of all mammals.

Family: Noctilionidae
Genus: Noctilio
 Greater bulldog bat, Noctilio leporinus 
Family: Molossidae
Genus: Tadarida
 Mexican free-tailed bat, Tadarida brasiliensis 
Family: Phyllostomidae
Subfamily: Brachyphyllinae
Genus: Brachyphylla
 Antillean fruit-eating bat, Brachyphylla cavernarum 
Subfamily: Glossophaginae
Genus: Monophyllus
 Insular single leaf bat, Monophyllus plethodon 
Family: Natalidae
Genus: Natalus
 Mexican funnel-eared bat, Natalus stramineus

Order: Cetacea (whales) 
The order Cetacea includes whales, dolphins and porpoises. They are the mammals most fully adapted to aquatic life with a spindle-shaped nearly hairless body, protected by a thick layer of blubber, and forelimbs and tail modified to provide propulsion underwater.

Suborder: Mysticeti
Family: Balaenopteridae (baleen whales)
Genus: Balaenoptera 
 Common minke whale, Balaenoptera acutorostrata
 Sei whale, Balaenoptera borealis
 Bryde's whale, Balaenoptera brydei
 Blue whale, Balaenoptera musculus
Genus: Megaptera
 Humpback whale, Megaptera novaeangliae
Suborder: Odontoceti
Superfamily: Platanistoidea
Family: Delphinidae (marine dolphins)
Genus: Delphinus
 Short-beaked common dolphin, Delphinus delphis 
Genus: Feresa
 Pygmy killer whale, Feresa attenuata 
Genus: Globicephala
 Short-finned pilot whale, Globicephala macrorhyncus 
Genus: Lagenodelphis
 Fraser's dolphin, Lagenodelphis hosei 
Genus: Grampus
 Risso's dolphin, Grampus griseus 
Genus: Orcinus
 Killer whale, Orcinus orca 
Genus: Peponocephala
 Melon-headed whale, Peponocephala electra 
Genus: Pseudorca
 False killer whale, Pseudorca crassidens 
Genus: Stenella
 Pantropical spotted dolphin, Stenella attenuata 
 Clymene dolphin, Stenella clymene 
 Striped dolphin, Stenella coeruleoalba 
 Atlantic spotted dolphin, Stenella frontalis 
 Spinner dolphin, Stenella longirostris 
Genus: Steno
 Rough-toothed dolphin, Steno bredanensis 
Genus: Tursiops
 Common bottlenose dolphin, Tursiops truncatus
Family: Physeteridae (sperm whales)
Genus: Physeter
 Sperm whale, Physeter catodon 
Family: Kogiidae (dwarf sperm whales)
Genus: Kogia
 Pygmy sperm whale, Kogia breviceps 
 Dwarf sperm whale, Kogia sima 
Superfamily Ziphioidea
Family: Ziphidae (beaked whales)
Genus: Mesoplodon
 Gervais' beaked whale, Mesoplodon europaeus 
Genus: Ziphius
 Cuvier's beaked whale, Ziphius cavirostris

Order: Carnivora (carnivorans) 

There are over 260 species of carnivorans, the majority of which feed primarily on meat. They have a characteristic skull shape and dentition.
Suborder: Pinnipedia 
Family: Phocidae (earless seals) 
 Genus: Cystophora
 Hooded seal, Cystophora cristata VU vagrant
Genus: Neomonachus
 Caribbean monk seal, N. tropicalis

Notes

References

See also
List of chordate orders
Lists of mammals by region
Mammal classification

 Mammals
Antigua and Barbuda
Mammals
Antigua and Barbuda